Thedford Public Schools is a school district headquartered in Thedford, Nebraska. It operates two schools: Thedford Elementary School and Thedford High School.

The high school's main athletic rivalry was with Sandhill High School in Dunning, but by 2009 the schools began sharing a single football team. The decline in agricultural labor in the United States caused a reduced number of residents in the towns and the lower proportions of children; this in turn resulted in lower enrollments in the two school districts.

References

External links
 Thedford Public Schools
Thomas County, Nebraska
School districts in Nebraska